An election was held for the leadership of the Meretz party on March 22, 2018. It saw the election of Tamar Zandberg.

Background
The vote was open to party members. Party membership increased by 12,000, to roughly 30,000, ahead of the vote. Outgoing leader Gal-On wanted the election to use an open primary-style system in which any Israeli citizen could vote, regardless of party registration. The party wound up instead adopting a compromise presented by Tamar Zandberg, which saw the party allow anyone to register as a party member up to a month before the leadership election and the party's slate-selection primary, and be allowed to participate in those elections.

Candidates

On ballot
Avi Buskila, former secretary general of Peace Now
David Cashni
Ofir Paz
Tamar Zandberg, member of the Knesset since 2013

Withdrawn
Zehava Gal-On, incumbent leader of Meretz
Avi Dabush endorsed Zandberg
Ilan Gilon, member of the Knesset (1999–2003; since 2009) endorsed Zandberg
Emri Kalman, endorsed Buskila
David Neve

Results
The party reported that 53.69% of eligible voters participated in the election. The party reported that 130 polling stations across Israel were utilized for the vote.

References

March 2018 events in Asia
Meretz leadership
Meretz leadership elections